Port LaBelle is a census-designated place (CDP) in Hendry and Glades counties, Florida, United States. The population was 3,530 at the 2010 census, up from 3,050 at the 2000 census.

Geography
Port LaBelle is located in northern Hendry County and extends north into Glades County. It is bordered to the west by the city of LaBelle. Florida State Road 80 runs through the northern part of the community, leading east  to Clewiston and west through LaBelle  to Fort Myers.

Demographics

As of the census of 2000, there were 3,050 people, 879 households, and 700 families residing in the CDP. The racial makeup of the CDP was 70.33% White, 10.66% African American, 0.69% Native American, 0.66% Asian, 13.84% from other races, and 3.84% from two or more races. Hispanic or Latino of any race were 44.30% of the population.

There were 879 households, out of which 44.1% had children under the age of 18 living with them, 57.7% were married couples living together, 15.5% had a female householder with no husband present, and 20.3% were non-families. 15.0% of all households were made up of individuals, and 6.5% had someone living alone who was 65 years of age or older.  The average household size was 3.20 and the average family size was 3.41.

In the CDP, the population was spread out, with 31.3% under the age of 18, 15.2% from 18 to 24, 28.2% from 25 to 44, 14.4% from 45 to 64, and 10.9% who were 65 years of age or older.  The median age was 27 years. For every 100 females, there were 120.7 males.  For every 100 females age 18 and over, there were 124.9 males.

The median income for a household in the CDP was $34,167, and the median income for a family was $36,974. Males had a median income of $25,104 versus $16,484 for females. The per capita income for the CDP was $13,704.  About 13.8% of families and 22.5% of the population were below the poverty line, including 20.4% of those under age 18 and 16.0% of those age 65 or over.

References

Census-designated places in Hendry County, Florida
Census-designated places in Florida
Census-designated places in Glades County, Florida
Planned communities in Florida